The gumbo darter (Etheostoma thompsoni) is a species of freshwater ray-finned fish, a darter from the subfamily Etheostomatinae, part of the family Percidae, which also contains the perches, ruffes and pikeperches. It is found in the Neches, Sabine, and Calcasieu River drainages in southeastern Texas and southwestern Louisiana. They inhabit riverbanks, where there are exposed roots with accumulated vegetational debris, and sand to mixed sand and gravel substrate with very little silt.

The gumbo darter was first formally described in 2012 by Royal Dallas Suttkus, Henry L. Bart Jr and David A. Etnier with the type locality given as the Neches River, just below the Town Bluff dam at Town Bluff, Tyler County, Texas. The specific name honors the biologist Dr Bruce Allen Thompson (1946-2007).

References

Etheostoma
Fish described in 2012
Taxa named by Royal Dallas Suttkus
Taxa named by Henry L. Bart Jr.
Taxa named by David A. Etnier